Heavenly are a twee pop band, originally forming in Oxford, England in 1989. Amelia Fletcher (vocals/guitar), Mathew Fletcher (drums; Amelia's brother), Peter Momtchiloff (guitar) and Robert Pursey (bass) had all been members of Talulah Gosh, a key member of the C86 scene.

History
Heavenly debuted with the 7" single "I Fell in Love Last Night", followed by another 7", "Our Love Is Heavenly", both released in 1990 on Sarah Records.  Heavenly vs. Satan, the group's debut album, came out in 1991. At this stage in their career, the instrumentation remained very much the same jangly guitar style used by Talulah Gosh.

Before releasing the critically acclaimed Le Jardin de Heavenly, Cathy Rogers (keyboard, back-up vocals) joined the band. Her harmony vocals and keyboards became an integral part of the group's sound. Another strikingly different element of the group's second album was the inclusion of the track, "C is the Heavenly Option," featuring the guest vocals of K Records founder Calvin Johnson, who released Heavenly's records in the US.

Before their next long-player, Heavenly released two non-album 7" singles, "P.U.N.K. Girl" and "Atta Girl." These signalled a growing complexity in Fletcher's songwriting, particularly "Atta Girl," in which Fletcher and Rogers sung in rapid-fire trade-off vocals. A broadening (and darkening) of lyrical subject matter was shown in the B-side, "Hearts and Crosses," which told the story of a date rape, with an upbeat keyboard riff providing an ironic counterpoint.

The band's third LP was The Decline and Fall of Heavenly (1994). In 1995, the band contributed the song "Snail Trail" to the AIDS benefit album Red Hot + Bothered produced by the Red Hot Organization.

The group's last album was Operation Heavenly (1996). Arriving in the middle of the Britpop boom, the album contained a cover of the Serge Gainsbourg-penned and France Gall-performed "Nous ne sommes pas des anges," sung entirely in French by Fletcher. Despite the closing of Sarah Records and release on Wiiija, the album was still recognisably the Heavenly sound, and even included a second Calvin Johnson guest spot on the track "Pet Monkey." However, shortly before the release of Operation Heavenly, Mathew Fletcher, took his own life. The remaining members announced that the band name Heavenly was to be retired, but that they would continue, using the name Marine Research, a moniker under which they released a single album, 1999's Sounds from the Gulf Stream, on K Records (it was not released separately in Britain). Afterwards, Marine Research dissolved. The band's core members reformed in 2002 as Tender Trap, releasing their debut album, Film Molecules, on K Records once again. 2006 saw the release of two new Tender Trap releases – two EPs, Language Lessons and ¿Como te Llamas?, and an album, 6 Billion People.

Heavenly will reunite for a concert at Bush Hall in London on 20 May 2023.

Discography

Albums
Heavenly vs. Satan (1991)
Le Jardin de Heavenly (1992)
The Decline and Fall of Heavenly (1994)
Operation Heavenly (1996)

EPs
P.U.N.K. Girl (1995)

See also
 Talulah Gosh
 The Pooh Sticks
 Marine Research
 Tender Trap

References

External links
 Go Heavenly!
 
 Heavenly at TweeNet

English pop music groups
K Records artists
Sarah Records artists
British indie pop groups
Musical groups established in 1989
Musical groups disestablished in 1996
Musical groups from Oxford